"Ángel de Amor" (English: Angel of Love) is the first radio single and Eleventh track from Maná's sixth studio album, Revolución de Amor (2002). On the week of August 3, 2002 the song debuted at number nine on the U.S. Billboard Hot Latin Tracks and after five weeks later on September 7, 2002, it reach to its highest point at the number six spot for only one week. It would stay for a total of 22 weeks.

Charts

The video is about a trapped girl who wants to be freed.

References

2002 singles
Maná songs
Spanish-language songs
Songs written by Fher Olvera
2002 songs